The next Australian federal election will be held some time during or before 2025 to elect members of the 48th Parliament of Australia. All 151 seats in the House of Representatives  and likely 40 of the 76 seats in the Senate will be contested. It is expected that at this election, the Labor government of Prime Minister Anthony Albanese will be seeking re-election to a second term in office, opposed by the Liberal/National Coalition under Leader of the Opposition Peter Dutton.

Background

Previous election

At the previous election in May 2022, the Labor Party, led by Anthony Albanese, formed government winning 77 seats in the House of Representatives, enough for a three-seat majority, whilst the Liberal/National Coalition claimed 58 seats and went into opposition. A record number of 16 seats were won by other parties and independents; four to the Greens, one each to Centre Alliance, Katter's Australian Party and the remaining 10 by independents forming the crossbench.

In the Senate, Labor made no gains and remained steady at 26 seats overall, whilst the Coalition lost some seats and retained only 32 seats. The Greens made gains and increased their share of seats to 12. One Nation maintained at 2 seats, Centre Alliance and Rex Patrick Team each lost their sole Senate seat, while Jacqui Lambie Network gained a second seat. David Pocock was also elected as an independent Senator, while United Australia Party also gained a Senate seat. This meant Labor required 13 additional votes to pass legislation.

Composition of parliament

The 47th Parliament opened on 26 July 2022. The Liberal Party entered the parliament with a new leader, with former defence and home affairs minister Peter Dutton replacing the outgoing prime minister Scott Morrison.

On 23 December 2022, Nationals MP for Calare Andrew Gee left the party and became an Independent, following the party's decision to publicly oppose an Indigenous Voice to Parliament. This meant that the Crossbench increased to 17 seats with the Coalition decreasing to 57 seats.

On 1 April 2023, a by-election will be held in the Division of Aston following the resignation of sitting Liberal MP Alan Tudge.

State of electorates

Redistribution

The Australian Electoral Commission is required, one year after the first sitting day for a new House of Representatives, to determine the number of members to which each State and Territory is entitled. If the number in any state changes, a redistribution will be required in those states. A redistribution will be postponed if it would begin within one year of the expiration of the House of Representatives.

Voter registration
Enrollment of eligible voters is compulsory. Voters must notify the AEC within 8 weeks of a change of address or after turning 18. The electoral rolls are closed for new enrollments or update of details about a week after the issue of writs for election. Enrollment is optional for 16- or 17-year-olds, but they cannot vote until they turn 18, and persons who have applied for Australian citizenship may also apply for provisional enrollment which takes effect on the granting of citizenship.

Election date

 

The election of senators must take place within one year before the terms expire for half-Senate elections, so that the writs for a half-Senate election cannot be issued earlier than 1 July 2024. Since campaigns are for a minimum of 33 days, the earliest possible date for a simultaneous House/half-Senate election is Saturday, 3 August 2024. The latest that a half-Senate election could be held must allow time for the votes to be counted and the writs to be returned before the newly elected senators take office on 1 July 2025. The previous election's writs were returned on 24 June 2022, 34 days after the 2022 federal election. Using this time frame, the last possible date for a half-Senate election to take place is Saturday 24 May 2025.

A double dissolution (a deadlock-breaking provision to dissolve both houses of parliament) cannot be called within six months before the date of the expiry of the House of Representatives. That means that any double dissolution of the 47th Parliament would have had to be granted by 25 January 2025. Allowing for the same stages indicated above, the last possible date for a double dissolution election would be 29 March 2025. This can only occur if a bill that passes the House of Representatives is rejected by the Senate twice, at least three months apart.

The constitutional and legal provisions which impact on the choice of election dates include:
 Section 12 of the Constitution says: "The Governor of any State may cause writs to be issued for the election of Senators for that State."
 Section 13 of the Constitution provides that the election of senators shall be held in the period of twelve months before the places become vacant.
 Section 28 of the Constitution says: "Every House of Representatives shall continue for three years from the first sitting of the House, and no longer, but may be sooner dissolved by the Governor-General." Since the 47th Parliament of Australia opened on 26 July 2022, it will expire on 25 July 2025.
 Section 32 of the Constitution says: "The writs shall be issued within ten days from the expiry of a House of Representatives or from the proclamation of a dissolution thereof." Ten days after 25 July 2025 is 4 August 2025.
 Section 156(1) of the CEA says: "The date fixed for the nomination of the candidates shall not be less than 10 days nor more than 27 days after the date of the writ." Twenty-seven days after 4 August 2025 is 31 August 2025.
 Section 157 of the CEA says: "The date fixed for the polling shall not be less than 23 days nor more than 31 days after the date of nomination." Thirty-one days after 31 August 2025 is 1 October 2025, a Wednesday.
 Section 158 of the CEA says: "The day fixed for the polling shall be a Saturday." The Saturday before 1 October 2025 is 27 September 2025, which was the latest possible date for the lower house election.

Candidates
Candidates for either house must be formally nominated with the Electoral Commission. The nomination for a party-endorsed candidate must be signed by the Registered Officer of a party registered under the Electoral Act. 100 signatures of eligible voters are required for an independent candidate as per section 166 of the Commonwealth Electoral Act 1918. A candidate can nominate for only one electorate, and must pass a number of qualifications.

A deposit of $2,000 will be required for a candidate for the House of Representatives or the Senate, which is refunded if the candidate is elected or gains at least 4% of the first preference vote. Between 10 and 27 days must be allowed after the issue of writs before the close of nominations.

Parties 

The table below lists party representation in the 47th Parliament.

Opinion polling

See also
 List of political parties in Australia

Notes

References

Future elections in Australia
Federal elections in Australia